Lithops is a genus of succulent plants in the ice plant family, Aizoaceae. Members of the genus are native to southern Africa. The name is derived from the Ancient Greek words  'stone' and  'face', referring to the stone-like appearance of the plants. They avoid being eaten by blending in with surrounding rocks and are often known as pebble plants or living stones.  The formation of the name from the Ancient Greek -ops means that even a single plant is called a Lithops.

Description 

Individual Lithops plants consist of one or more pairs of bulbous, almost fused leaves opposite to each other and hardly any stem. The slit between the leaves contains the meristem and produces flowers and new leaves. The leaves of Lithops are mostly buried below the surface of the soil, with a partially or completely translucent top surface known as a leaf window which allows light to enter the interior of the leaves for photosynthesis.

During winter a new leaf pair, or occasionally more than one, grows inside the existing fused leaf pair.  In spring the old leaf pair parts to reveal the new leaves and the old leaves will then dry up.  Lithops leaves may shrink and disappear below ground level during drought.  Lithops in habitat almost never have more than one leaf pair per head, presumably as an adaptation to the arid environment.  Yellow or white flowers emerge from the fissure between the leaves after the new leaf pair has fully matured, one per leaf pair.  This is usually in autumn, but can be before the summer solstice in L. pseudotruncatella and after the winter solstice in L. optica.  The flowers are often sweetly scented.

The most startling adaptation of Lithops is the colouring of the leaves.  The leaves are fenestrated, and the epidermal windows are patterned in various shades of cream, grey, and brown, with darker windowed areas, dots, and red lines, according to species and local conditions.  The markings function as remarkable camouflage for the plant in its typical stone-like environment. As is typical of a window plant, the green tissue lines the inside of the leaves and is covered with translucent tissue beneath the epidermal windows.

Lithops are obligate outcrossers and require pollination from a separate plant.  Like most mesembs, Lithops fruit is a dry capsule that opens when it becomes wet; some seeds may be ejected by falling raindrops, and the capsule re-closes when it dries out. Capsules may also sometimes detach and be distributed intact, or may disintegrate after several years.

Distribution 

Lithops occur naturally across wide areas of Namibia and South Africa, as well as small bordering areas in Botswana and possibly Angola, from sea level to high mountains. Nearly a thousand individual populations are documented, each covering just a small area of dry grassland, veld, or bare rocky ground.  Different Lithops species are preferentially found in particular environments, usually restricted to a particular type of rock.  Lithops have not naturalised outside this region.

Rainfall in Lithops habitats ranges from approximately 700 mm/year to near zero. Rainfall patterns range from exclusively summer rain to exclusively winter rain, with a few species relying almost entirely on dew formation for moisture. Temperatures are usually hot in summer and cool to cold in winter, but one species is found right at the coast with very moderate temperatures year round.

Cultivation 

Lithops are popular house plants and many specialist succulent growers maintain collections. Seeds and plants are widely available in shops and over the Internet.  They are relatively easy to grow and care for if given sufficient sun and kept in well-draining soil. 

Normal treatment in mild temperate climates is to keep them completely dry during winter, watering only when the old leaves have dried up and are replaced by a new leaf pair.  Watering continues through autumn, when the plants flower, and then stops for winter.  The best results are obtained in an environment with additional heat such as a greenhouse.  In hotter climates, Lithops will have a summer dormancy when they should be kept mostly dry, and they may require some water in winter.  In tropical climates, Lithops can be grown primarily in winter with a long summer dormancy.  In all conditions, Lithops will be most active and need most water during autumn and each species will flower at approximately the same time.

Lithops thrive best in a coarse, well-drained substrate.  Any soil that retains too much water will cause the plants to burst their skins as they over-expand.  Plants grown in strong light will develop hard strongly coloured skins which are resistant to damage and rot, although persistent overwatering will still be fatal.  Excessive heat will kill potted plants as they cannot cool themselves by transpiration and rely on staying buried in cool soil below the surface.  Commercial growers mix a mild fungicide or weak strength horticultural sulfur into the plant's water to prevent rotting.  Lithops are sensitive to watering during hot weather, which can cause the plants to rot; in habitat the plants are often dormant when the temperatures are high, doing most of their growing during the cool months of the year.  Low light levels will make the plants highly susceptible to rotting and fungal infection.

In the United Kingdom the following species have gained the Royal Horticultural Society's Award of Garden Merit:

Lithops karasmontana  
Lithops olivacea 
Lithops pseudotruncatella
Lithops salicola 
Lithops schwantesii

Propagation

Propagation of Lithops is by seed or cuttings.  Cuttings can only be used to produce new plants after a plant has naturally divided to form multiple heads, so most propagation is by seed.  Lithops can readily be pollinated by hand if two separate clones of a species flower at the same time, and seed will be ripe about 9 months later.  Seed is easy to germinate, but the seedlings are small and vulnerable for the first year or two, and will not flower until at least two or three years old.

History 

The first scientific description of Lithops was made by botanist and artist William John Burchell, explorer of South Africa, although he called it Mesembryanthemum turbiniforme. In 1811, Burchell discovered a specimen when picking up a "curiously shaped pebble" from the ground. Unfortunately the documented physical description was not detailed enough to be sure which Lithops he had discovered and the name Lithops turbiniformis is no longer used, although for many years it was applied to what is now known as Lithops hookeri.

Several more Lithops were published as Mesembryanthemum species until in 1922 N E Brown started to split up the overly large genus on the basis of the capsules. The genus Lithops was created and dozens more species were published in the following decades.  Brown, Gustav Schwantes, Kurt Dinter, Gert Nel, and Louisa Bolus continued to document Lithops from across southern Africa, but there was little consensus on the relationships between them, or even which populations should be grouped as species.  As recently as the 1950s, the genus remained rather unknown in cultivation and was not well understood taxonomically.

In the 1950s, Desmond and Naureen Cole began to study Lithops. Together, the couple visited nearly all natural habitats of the different lithops populations and collected samples from approximately 400. They document and identify them, assigning a number, which is now known as the Cole number still used today all around the world. They studied and revised the genus, in 1988 publishing a definitive book (Lithops: Flowering Stones) describing the species, subspecies, and varieties which have been accepted ever since.

Because their camouflage is so effective, new species continue to be discovered, sometimes in remote regions of Namibia and South Africa, and sometimes in well-populated areas where they simply had been overlooked for generations. Recent discoveries include L. coleorum in 1994, L. hermetica in 2000, and L. amicorum in 2006.

Taxonomy 
Many of the species listed have named subspecies or varieties and some have many regional forms identified by old names or habitat locations.  Identification of species is primarily by flower colour and leaf patterns.

Gallery

References

Literature

External links

 Lithops info from the BBC (UK)
 A guide to the cultivation of Lithops
 Lithops books and links
 Lithops gallery
 Lithops photo album (François Hoes, Belgium)
 plantesdepedra.com (Catalan info + translator)
 manolithops.es (Spanish info)
 Scrapbooklithops (General info & habitat photographs)

 
Articles containing video clips
Aizoaceae genera
Taxa named by N. E. Brown
Succulent plants